Serp i Molot is Russian for hammer and sickle.

It may also refer to:
 FC Serp i Molot Moscow, a Russian football club
 Moscow Metallurgical Plant Serp i Molot
 Serp i Molot (newspaper), a Russian Communist newspaper